Sky Bike or Sky-bike may refer to:
Personal Flight Sky-Bike, an American powered paraglider design
Personal Flight Sky-Bike Trike, an American powered parachute design